No New Friends may refer to:
"No New Friends" (DJ Khaled song), 2013
"No New Friends" (LSD song), 2019